Bosasa was a South African company specialising in providing services to government, most notably prison services. It was controversial for its involvement in corruption allegations exposed during the Zondo Commission of Inquiry.  It consisted of Bosasa Group, Bosasa Youth Development Centres, and African Global Operations (formerly Bosasa Operations).

History 
Then known as Dyambu Operations, the company started providing services to prisons in 1995 when it established the Bosasa Youth Development Centres with the Gauteng Department of Social Development when government privatised juvenile detention facilities.

Gavin Watson bought Bosasa in the year 2000. The following year in 2001 ANC politician and close associate of the Watson family, Linda (Richman) Mti, became prisons commissioner. The company then received its first large contract from government in 2004 when the Department of Correctional Services awarded it a contract to provide catering services to the prison system.  The company is estimated to have received government tenders to the value of R12 billion (US$918.8 million) between 2003 and 2018.

On the 18 February 2019 the company announced that it would be going into voluntary liquidation after their banks announced that they would be closing all Bosasa related accounts as the banks sought to distance themselves from the company following allegations of corruption.

Names
The company was founded in 1981 as Emafini (Pty) Ltd.  After a change of management the company changed its name to Meritum Hostels (Pty) Ltd in 1985 changing its name again to Dyambu Operations (Pty) Ltd in 1996 after signing an agreement with the ANC Women's League controlled Dyambu Trust. Gavin Watson was then made company CEO. The company was re-named Bosasa 2000.

In 2017 the company changed the name of its Bosasa Operations division to African Global Operations.

Corruption
The company's former chief operating officer, Angelo Agrizzi, testified to the Zondo Commission that the company was extensively involved in corrupt activities during the presidency of Jacob Zuma that directly implicated then President Zuma and his associates. These involved monthly payments of R300,000 collected on behalf of Zuma by former South African Airways chairperson Dudu Myeni. It is also involved donations and kickbacks to the African National Congress (ANC) and key party members including a R500,000 donation to Cyril Ramaphosa during his 2017 campaign for president of the ANC. Agrizzi also claimed that government minister Nomvula Mokonyane was paid R50,000 a month for years to protect the company from law enforcement agencies and that the company paid R300,000 for security upgrades to properties owned by Gwede Mantashe.

Agrizzi also provided evidence showing that important individuals, Nomgcobo Jiba and Lawrence Mrwebi, involved in investigating Bosasa were also being bribed by the company so as to avoid prosecution.

ANC Eastern Cape treasurer Babalo Madikizela has stated that the Bosasa scandal will make it more difficult for the ANC to raise funds in the future.  News24 reported that its estimated that over R40 million was donated by Bosasa over the years to the ANC representing a significant source of revenue for the party.

The scandal led to comparisons of Bosasa and its executives to the controversial Gupta family. 

Bosasa's role in state capture and corruption was the subject of Part 3 of the Zondo Commissions's findings published on 1 March 2022. The commission found that the company "bribed politicians, government officials, President Jacob Zuma and others extensively. Bosasa and its directors and other officials simply had no shame in engaging in acts of corruption” and that “the evidence revealed that corruption was Bosasa’s way of doing business.”

External links 
Published findings by the Zondo Commission on Bosasa:

 Judicial Commission of Inquiry into State Capture Report: Part 3 Vol. 1: BOSASA (1 March 2022)
 Judicial Commission of Inquiry into State Capture Report: Part 3 Vol. 2: BOSASA (1 March 2022)
 Judicial Commission of Inquiry into State Capture Report: Part 3 Vol. 3: BOSASA (1 March 2022)
 Judicial Commission of Inquiry into State Capture Report: Part 3 Vol. 4: BOSASA (1 March 2022)

References

2018 in South Africa
South African brands
Companies based in Gauteng
Mogale City Local Municipality
Corruption in South Africa